Kagulu Hill, also Kagulu Rock, is a rocky prominence that rises , above sea level, in the Eastern Region of Uganda.

Location
The hill is located in Buyende county, Buyende District, in Uganda's Eastern Region.

The coordinates of Kagulu Hill are 01°13'15.0"N, 33°19'50.0"E (Latitude:1.220833; Longitude:33.330556).

History
Oral tradition holds that the Basoga migrated to present-day Busoga from the east, circa 1650 AD. The original Basoga are said to have arrived across Lake Kyoga and settled in the caves at the bottom of this hill. The Basoga have traditional caretakers who live on the hill, going back many centuries.

The caves were discovered in 1686, during the reign of Olimi I of Bunyoro Kitara. When Bunyoro conquered Busoga, Prince Mukama Namutukula of Bunyoro made the Kagulu caves his personal residence. To the west of Kagulu Hill, are six smaller hills in a line namely; Kagwese, Mawaale, Mpanga, Nakyeere, Bukolimo and Butadewo.

Tourism

Due to the panoramic view from the top, the rocky hill has become a tourist attraction in the 21st century. From the top of Kagulu Hill, one can view the Victoria Nile, where it enters Lake Kyoga. There is a waterfall, where water emanates from the rocks and cascades down the hill. Exploring the caves at the bottom of the hill offers another activity to visiting travelers.

See also
 Kyabazinga of Busoga
 Kaliro
Busoga

References

External links
Climbing Kagulu Hill of Mystery As of 2 June 2013.

Buyende District
Mountains of Uganda
Busoga
Eastern Region, Uganda